Vahl-Ebersing is a commune in the Moselle department in Grand Est in north-eastern France.

See also
Communes of the Moselle department

References

External links

Vahlebersing